In enzymology, a precorrin-6A reductase is an enzyme that catalyzes the chemical reaction

precorrin-6A + NADPH + H+  precorrin-6B + NADP+

The three substrates of this enzyme are precorrin 6A, NADPH and a proton; its two products are precorrin 6B and NADP+.

This enzyme belongs to the family of oxidoreductases, specifically those acting on the CH=CH group of an acceptor with NAD or NADPH as donor.  The systematic name of this enzyme class is precorrin-6B:NADP+ oxidoreductase. Other names in common use include precorrin-6X reductase, precorrin-6Y:NADP+ oxidoreductase and CobK. This enzyme is part of the biosynthetic pathway to cobalamin (vitamin B12) in aerobic bacteria.

See also
 Cobalamin biosynthesis

References

 
 

EC 1.3.1
NADPH-dependent enzymes
Enzymes of unknown structure